Amuquhu (Mandarin: 阿木去乎镇) is a town in Xiahe County, Gannan Tibetan Autonomous Prefecture, Gansu, China. In 2010, Amuquhu had a total population of 12,623: 3,032 males and 8,593 females: 3,032 aged under 14, 8,593 aged between 15 and 65 and 998 aged over 65.

References 

Towns in China